Oscar "Oz" Sanchez (born December 2, 1975) is an American Paralympic handcyclist and triathlete. A former Marine, he has a spinal cord injury following a motorcycle accident in 2001. He started handcycling competitively in 2006, and competes in the H5 classification. At the 2011 Parapan American Games, Sanchez won a gold in the road race and time trial for his classification. He won medals at the 2008, 2012 Paralympic Games and 2016 Paralympic Games. Sanchez was also a medallist at the UCI Para-cycling Road World Championships in 2009, 2010 and 2011.

His story is featured in the 2009 documentary Unbeaten, directed by Steven C. Barber. He is of Mexican American descent.

Medals at the Paralympic Games

2016 
  - Cycling - mixed team relay
  - Cycling - time trial

2012 
  - Cycling - team relay
  - Cycling - time trial

2008 
  - Cycling - time trial
  - Cycling - road race

References

External links
 
 
 
 

Living people
American male cyclists
Cyclists at the 2008 Summer Paralympics
Cyclists at the 2012 Summer Paralympics
Paralympic cyclists of the United States
Paralympic gold medalists for the United States
Paratriathletes of the United States
1975 births
UCI Para-cycling World Champions
American disabled sportspeople
American male triathletes
Medalists at the 2008 Summer Paralympics
American sportspeople of Mexican descent
Medalists at the 2012 Summer Paralympics
Medalists at the 2016 Summer Paralympics
Paralympic medalists in cycling